Mand may refer to:


Places
Mánd, a village in Szabolcs-Szatmár-Bereg county, Hungary
Mand (village), a village in Madhya Pradesh, India
Mand, Iran (disambiguation), two villages in Iran 
Mand (Kech District), a town in Balochistan, Pakistan
Mand, West Virginia, United, States an unincorporated community
Mand River, a river in India

People with the surname
Andreas Mand (born 1959), German writer
Mänd, an Estonian surname

Other uses
Mand (psychology), B. F. Skinner's term for a verbal operant
Mand (singing style), a style of folk music in Rajasthan, India

See also
 
 Manda (disambiguation)
 Mande (disambiguation)
 Mando (disambiguation)
 Mandy (disambiguation)